Check is an unincorporated community in Floyd County, Virginia, United States. Check has a post office with ZIP code 24072, which opened on July 23, 1883. The origin of the name "Check" is obscure.

Check contains a primary school, Check Elementary School, which is located in the old Check High School building.

References

Unincorporated communities in Floyd County, Virginia
Unincorporated communities in Virginia